Mills Township is a civil township of Midland County in the U.S. state of Michigan, United States.  The population was 1,871 at the 2000 census.

Geography
According to the United States Census Bureau, the township has a total area of 36.0 square miles (93.2 km), of which, 35.0 square miles (90.6 km) of it is land and 1.0 square miles (2.6 km) of it (2.83%) is water.

Demographics
As of the census of 2000, there were 1,871 people, 659 households, and 514 families residing in the township. There were 689 housing units at an average density of 19.7 per square mile (7.6/km). The racial makeup of the township was 97.97% White, 0.21% African American, 0.86% Native American, 0.11% Asian, 0.21% from other races, and 0.64% from two or more races. Hispanic or Latino of any race were 1.92% of the population.

There were 659 households, out of which 39.3% had children under the age of 18 living with them, 65.6% were married couples living together, 7.3% had a female householder with no husband present, and 22.0% were non-families. 16.8% of all households were made up of individuals, and 5.2% had someone living alone who was 65 years of age or older.  The average household size was 2.83 and the average family size was 3.20.

In the township the population was spread out, with 29.0% under the age of 18, 7.5% from 18 to 24, 33.0% from 25 to 44, 22.8% from 45 to 64, and 7.6% who were 65 years of age or older.  The median age was 35 years. For every 100 females, there were 102.1 males.  For every 100 females age 18 and over, there were 100.6 males.

The median income for a household in the township was $40,530, and the median income for a family was $43,971. Males had a median income of $35,050 versus $23,516 for females. The per capita income for the township was $16,718.  About 7.1% of families and 10.1% of the population were below the poverty line, including 12.6% of those under age 18 and 4.6% of those age 65 or over.

References

Townships in Midland County, Michigan
Townships in Michigan
1894 establishments in Michigan
Populated places established in 1894